The Swan 36 Frers was designed by German Frers with styling input by Andrew Winch and built by Nautor's Swan it was developed alongside it big brother the Swan 44 Frers.

External links
 Nautor Swan
 German Frers Official Website

References

Sailing yachts
Keelboats
1980s sailboat type designs
Sailboat types built by Nautor Swan
Sailboat type designs by Germán Frers